Sergio de Castro may refer to:

Sergio de Castro (economist), Chilean economist who served the military junta headed by Augusto Pinochet as economy and finance minister
Sergio de Castro (artist) (1922–2012), French-Argentinian artist

See also
Sergio Castro, Mexican humanitarian